Éva Andrea Hajmási (born 14 February 1987) is a Hungarian wheelchair fencer. She represented Hungary at the 2016 Summer Paralympics held in Rio de Janeiro, Brazil and she won the silver medal in the women's team foil event. She also won the bronze medal in this event at the 2020 Summer Paralympics held in Tokyo, Japan.

At the 2020 Summer Paralympics, she competed in the women's individual foil A event where she lost her bronze medal match against Rong Jing of China.

In January 2022 the wheelchair fencing team of Gyöngyi Dani, Zsuzsanna Krajnyák, Dr. Boglárka Mező Madarászné and Hajmási were Hungary's "best disabled team of the year".

References 

Living people
1987 births
Place of birth missing (living people)
Hungarian female foil fencers
Wheelchair fencers at the 2016 Summer Paralympics
Wheelchair fencers at the 2020 Summer Paralympics
Medalists at the 2016 Summer Paralympics
Medalists at the 2020 Summer Paralympics
Paralympic silver medalists for Hungary
Paralympic bronze medalists for Hungary
Paralympic medalists in wheelchair fencing
Paralympic wheelchair fencers of Hungary
21st-century Hungarian women